MNAC may refer to:

Museu Nacional de Arte Contemporânea in Lisbon, Portugal

National Museum of Contemporary Art (Muzeul Naţional de Artă Contemporană) in Bucharest, Romania
Museu Nacional d'Art de Catalunya in Barcelona, Catalonia, Spain

MnAc may refer to:
Manganese(III) acetate